The New Guy is a 2002 American teen comedy film directed by Ed Decter, written by David Kendall and starring DJ Qualls and Eliza Dushku.

The film tells the story of high school loser Dizzy Harrison (Qualls) who gets himself expelled so that he can move schools and reinvent himself. Learning how to be cool from a prison inmate, he renames himself  Gil Harris and is quick to make new friends and soon gains respect from jocks and geeks alike. He begins dating popular girl Danielle (Dushku) and unites a once-divided school, also greatly improving its football team. Eventually, Gil has to face his demons from his old school when they face each other in a football game. The film received generally negative reviews, but was a modest box office success.

Plot
Prison inmate Luther speaks directly to the camera in the opening, telling the story of Dizzy Gillespie Harrison, an 18-year-old nerdy high school senior in Austin, Texas. Dizzy is friends with Nora, Kirk, and Glen, who together started a funk rock band called "Suburban Funk" and are addicted to video games. 

Attending Rocky Creek High School, Dizzy is picked on by everyone, especially star football player Barclay. After Tina Osgood touches his arm, causing him to have an erection and embarrassing him as the jocks belittle him, his briefs are yanked from under his pants and placed around his head. The school librarian "breaks" his penis after Dizzy refuses to "hand" over the "weapon" to her. 

Dizzy is misdiagnosed with Tourette's syndrome and placed on medication by the school counselor, who advises his father to spend every possible moment with him. While at the mall's food court, the heavily medicated Dizzy makes a fool of himself at a church revival and gets arrested.

In jail, Dizzy meets Luther, who turns out to be a sympathetic ex-victim who makes it his goal to teach him how to be cool. To wipe the slate clean, Dizzy gets himself expelled from his old high school, then undergoes a makeover with the help of the prison inmates and guards. Changing his name to "Gil Harris", he enrolls at East Highland High and makes an impression by being dropped off in a prison van in restraints and beating up the school bully, Conner.

The action has the intended effect, and head cheerleader Danielle welcomes the newcomer to school. Her friend Courtney invites Dizzy to a party and through a mishap, he gives her the impression that he has blown her off. Using a photo given to him by the prison inmates and help from his old friends, Dizzy manages to escape the party with his reputation intact. Upon returning home, however, he finds his father has sold their house and quit work to supervise him, which results in them living in a trailer.

Danielle asks Dizzy to encourage the school to go to see the football team play; he, referencing General Patton and Braveheart, gives an impassioned speech, inspiring the team to win their first game in years. He is soon enlisted by the coach and principal to plan the school's homecoming dance, and becomes imbued with school spirit, shedding his bad boy image. Danielle breaks up with Conner and starts a relationship with Dizzy.

However, Dizzy and Gil are fast becoming too big for one body. When Nora berates Dizzy for becoming the same person he once hated, he uses his newfound popularity to confront Conner. Dizzy and Danielle spur the students to reunite, and the lines dividing the different cliques are broken. 

With a new philosophy, the school football team wins more games and bullying becomes a thing of the past. Reaching the state championship, where they play Rocky Creek, Dizzy's antics on the sideline cost Rocky Creek the game. 

After Rocky Creek's loss to East Highland, Barclay slowly starts realizing who Gil is, as East Highland High celebrates their victory. At school the next day, while East Highland still celebrates, Barclay confronts and attempts to fight Dizzy, but before he can do anything, he is attacked by the entire student body. After the attack, Conner helps Barclay up from the ground, telling him he wants to know what he knows about Dizzy.

The homecoming dance, which Dizzy's funk band is supposed to play, is crashed by the students of Rocky Creek. Barclay and Conner, who have joined forces to set a trap for Dizzy, play an embarrassing video of the librarian incident. However, Luther and the other inmates arrive to save Dizzy, tying up the two bullies. Nora admits longstanding feelings for Glen, and Danielle reveals to Dizzy that she was also a nerd growing up. She forgives him for hiding who he was, and they kiss.

Luther ends the film, and the man he is talking to is revealed to be David Hasselhoff. In a mid-credits scene, Dizzy and Danielle mount a horse and ride off into the sunset together.

Cast

Cameo appearances

Production
The film was shot in Austin and around Austin (San Marcos, Elgin, and Del Valle) utilized Texas State University, Driskell Hotel, and an FYE at Lakeline Mall between October 23, 2000 to January 12, 2001.

Unrated version
In the 92-minute unrated cut, Dizzy appears to be a "child of divorce." He once had a mother named Beth Anne but she left the family while Dizzy was doing his "godfather of soul" routine. Miss Kiki Pierce talks about Dizzy's excessive masturbation and becomes his stepmother in the uncensored version (unlike the PG-13 version).

According to the storyline in the uncensored version, Gil Harris had apparently murdered a guy in Rhode Island before being sent off to prison while no back story was made for the name in the theatrical version.

Reception
Rotten Tomatoes gives the film a score of 7% based on 99 reviews, with an average rating of 3.30/10. The consensus reads: "Incoherent, silly, and unoriginal, The New Guy offers up the same old teen gross-out comedy cliches." On Metacritic, the film has a 24% rating, indicating "generally unfavorable reviews" based on reviews from 23 critics.

The film grossed $31,167,388 worldwide against a $13 million production budget.

Soundtrack
 "The New Guy" by Mystikal
 "I'm Just a Kid" by Simple Plan
 "You Really Got Me" by Eve 6
 "Keep the Party Goin'" by Juvenile
 "So Fresh, So Clean" by OutKast
 "Outsider" by Green Day
 "Uh Huh" by B2K
 "So Dizzy" by Rehab
 "Breakout" by OPM
 "Dark Side" by Wheatus
 "I Love You" by Nine Days
 "Heart in Hand" by Vertical Horizon
 "Hi-Lo" by JT Money
 "Let It Whip" by SR-71

Songs that were featured in the film but do not appear on the soundtrack include:
 "Super Bad" by James Brown
 "Action Figure Party" by Action Figure Party
 "(Rock) Superstar" by Cypress Hill
 "Click Click Boom" by Saliva
 "Boléro" by Hungarian State Orchestra
 "The Good, the Bad and the Ugly" by Ennio Morricone
 "In the Air Tonight" by Phil Collins
 "Also sprach Zarathustra" by Interstellar Force
 "Dammit, I Changed Again" by The Offspring
 "Bounce" by Glo & Eklips
 "She's a Bad Mama Jama (She's Built, She's Stacked)" by Carl Carlton
 "The Battle Hymn of the Republic" by St. John's Cathedral Choirs and Festival Orchestra
 "Lookin' for Love" by Johnny Lee
 "Girl All the Bad Guys Want" by Bowling for Soup
 "New Religion Every Day" by American Steel
 "Soar" by All Too Much
 "The New You" by Laptop
 "The Anthem" by Good Charlotte
 "Wannabe Gangster* by Wheatus

References

External links

 
 
 
 
 

2002 films
2002 comedy films
2002 directorial debut films
2000s teen comedy films
American prison films
American teen comedy films
Films set in Austin, Texas
Films shot in Austin, Texas
Films shot in Texas
Revolution Studios films
Columbia Pictures films
African-American comedy films
2000s English-language films
2000s American films